Bruno Henrique Lopes (born 19 May 1995) is a Brazilian footballer who plays for Oeste as a forward. He has also been capped at the youth international level.

Club career
Born in Londrina, Lopes started his career with the youth setup of Marcílio Dias and switched to the academy of Criciúma in December 2011. With the youth team, he emerged as the top-scorer of the Copa do Brasil Sub-20. On 20 June 2013, he was promoted to the first team and his contract was extended till the end of 2017. On 8 August 2013, Lopes made his Série A debut and scored his first goal for the club in a 2–1 defeat against Cruzeiro. In his first season with the club, he won the Catarinense.

On 17 June 2016, Lopes moved abroad for the first time and signed for Portuguese club FC Arouca, after agreeing to a three-year deal.  On 6 July, he scored twice in a 2–0 victory against Famalicão in a pre-season friendly. On 25 August, he made his first team defeat, coming as a substitute for Gegé in a 2–1 defeat against Greek club Olympiacos in the UEFA Europa League. On 13 January 2017, he was loaned out to Brazilian club Grêmio Esportivo Brasil till 30 June. Once his loan ended, his parent club refused to reloan him to the club.

On 8 January 2018, Lopes returned to Brazil and signed with second tier club Oeste. On 13 April, he scored his first Série B goal for the club in a 2–0 victory against CRB.

International career
Lopes has been capped by the under-20. He represented the side in the 2014 Panda Cup, which was won by Brazil after defeating China by 4–1 in the final match.

Career statistics

Honours
Criciúma
 Campeonato Catarinense : 2013

References

External links

1995 births
Living people
Association football forwards
Brazilian footballers
Criciúma Esporte Clube players
F.C. Arouca players
Grêmio Esportivo Brasil players
Oeste Futebol Clube players
Campeonato Brasileiro Série A players
Campeonato Brasileiro Série B players
Primeira Liga players
Brazilian expatriate footballers
Brazilian expatriate sportspeople in Portugal
Brazil youth international footballers
Sportspeople from Londrina